The Jeep FJ Fleetvan was a compact delivery van manufactured by Willys Motors and Kaiser-Jeep from 1961 to 1975. It was based on the DJ-3A Dispatcher, but equipped with the F-134 Hurricane engine. Two models were available, the FJ-3 and the longer FJ-3A. It came standard with the familiar Borg-Warner T-90 three-speed manual transmission. A Borg-Warner automatic was offered as an option.

Postal Service 
Right-hand-drive FJ-3s were made for the US Postal Service. Most of these had horizontal grille slats in contrast to the seven vertical slats found on standard models.

The FJ-6 model (based on the CJ-6) was introduced in 1965 for postal use, which was ultimately replaced by the FJ-8 & FJ-9 introduced in 1975.

References

FJ
Vans
Cars introduced in 1961
Motor vehicles manufactured in the United States
Trucks of the United States
Kaiser Motors
Willys vehicles